Runk Bridge, also known as Huntingdon County Bridge No. 9, is a historic Pratt truss bridge spanning Aughwick Creek and located at Shirley Township, Huntingdon County, Pennsylvania, United States.  It was built by the Pennsylvania Bridge Co. in 1898.  It measures  in length and has two spans.

It was added to the National Register of Historic Places in 1990.

See also
List of bridges documented by the Historic American Engineering Record in Pennsylvania

References

External links

Road bridges on the National Register of Historic Places in Pennsylvania
Bridges completed in 1889
Bridges in Huntingdon County, Pennsylvania
Historic American Engineering Record in Pennsylvania
National Register of Historic Places in Huntingdon County, Pennsylvania
Pratt truss bridges in the United States
Metal bridges in the United States